Kani Gol-e Olya (also Romanized as Kānī Gol-e ‘Olyā; also known as Kānī Gol-e Bālā) is a village in Palanganeh Rural District, in the Central District of Javanrud County, Kermanshah Province, Iran. At the 2006 census, its population was 165, in 31 families.

References 

Populated places in Javanrud County